Ewa Halina Rybak-Pisiewicz (born May 7, 1962 in Lubartów, Lubelskie) is a former female track and field sprinter from Poland, who represented her native country at the 1988 Summer Olympics in Seoul, South Korea. She set her personal best (11.19) in the women's 100 metres event in 1985.

References
 sports-reference

1962 births
Living people
Polish female sprinters
Athletes (track and field) at the 1988 Summer Olympics
Olympic athletes of Poland
People from Lubartów
Sportspeople from Lublin Voivodeship
Olympic female sprinters